Mohammad Kaykobad is a computer scientist, educator, author, and columnist from Bangladesh. Along with Muhammed Zafar Iqbal, he started the national mathematics olympiad. He was a professor of computer science and engineering in Bangladesh University of Engineering and Technology.
and currently is a faculty member of computer science and engineering in BRAC University.

Education
In 1970, Kaykobad finished his SSC from Manikganj Govt. High School and in 1972, his HSC from Debendra College. He did his M.S. in Engineering at the Institute of Marine Engineers, Odessa, Ukraine (then in the USSR), in 1979. He did his M.Eng. in computer applications technology at the Asian Institute of Technology, Thailand, in 1982. He did his PhD at the Flinders University of South Australia, in 1986 under the Supervision of Dr FJM Salzborn.

Career
Dr. Kaykobad served as an adviser to ICT Projects for e-Governance in Bangladesh. He was awarded the gold medal for contribution in ICT Education at a ceremony at Bangabandhu International Conference Center by Bangladesh Computer Society and was presented the award by the President of Bangladesh on 26 July 2005. He was recognized as the best coach of ACM International Collegiate Programming Contest by IBM at 26th World Finals of ACM ICPC at Honolulu, Hawaii on 22 March 2002. He researched the Computerization of class scheduling of different universities of Bangladesh which was submitted to University Grants Commission in 1995. He is a member of the Bangladesh Academy of Sciences.

Honors and awards
 Received the Best Coach award in 2002 at Honolulu, Hawaii
 Recognized as a distinguished alumnus by the Flinders University of South Australia.

References

1954 births
Living people
Fellows of Bangladesh Academy of Sciences
Asian Institute of Technology alumni
Academic staff of Bangladesh University of Engineering and Technology
People from Manikganj District
Bangladeshi computer scientists